Umm Ḥakīm bint al-Ḥārith ibn Hishām was a female companion of Muhammad and later a wife of Umar, the second caliph of Islam.

Family life 
Umm Hakim was daughter of al-Harith al-Makhzumi (ibn Hisham ibn al-Mughira ibn Abd Allah ibn Umar ibn Makhzum). Her mother's name was Fatima bint al-Walid ibn al-Mughira ibn Abd Allah ibn Umar ibn Makhzum.

She was wife of Ikrima Abi Jahl, who was killed in the Battle of the Yarmuk. 

Later she was married to Umar ibn al-Khattab, from whom she had a daughter named Fatima.

According to another source, she was married to Abu Sa'id Khalid ibn Sa'id on the evening preceding Battle of Marj al-Saffar, Abu Sa'id was killed in the battle.

Battle of Uhud 
In the battle of Uhud she accompanied Ikrima and other Quraysh of Mecca who fought against the Muslims. She, along with other women, beat drums as they led the group of Quraysh women onto the battlefield.

Conquest of Mecca 
In 630 CE, when the Muslims conquered Mecca, Umm Hakim converted to Islam along with the other Quraysh. Subsequently, Umm Hakim convinced her husband Ikrima to accept Islam.

Battle of Marj al-Saffar 
After Abu Sa'id was killed, Umm Hakim single-handedly killed seven Byzantine soldiers with a tent pole near a bridge which is now known as the Bridge of Umm Hakim near Damascus, during the battle of Marj al-Saffar in 634.

References

Women companions of the Prophet
Women in medieval warfare
Women in war in the Middle East
Arab people of the Arab–Byzantine wars
7th-century Arabs
Banu Makhzum
Year of birth unknown
Year of death unknown
Arab women in war